Kevin Hofbauer is an Australian actor known for his role as Constable Christian Tapu in the Australian police drama series Rush. He is also known for his role in Offspring.


Early life
Hofbauer graduated from Victorian College of Arts and Music (VCAM) in 2009, after attending since 2007.

He joined the ensemble of Red Stitch Actors Theatre in mid-2016.

Filmography

References

External links 
 
 

Australian male actors
Living people
Year of birth missing (living people)
Place of birth missing (living people)